Lanza may refer to:

People

Surname
 Adam Lanza (1992–2012), American spree killer and perpetrator of the 2012 Sandy Hook Elementary School shooting
 Alcides Lanza (born 1929), Canadian composer
 Andrew Lanza (born 1964), New York State senator
 Angela Lanza, American singer
 Beatrice Lanza (born 1982), Italian athlete
 Cesare Lanza (born 1942), Italian journalist and author
 Chuck Lanza (born 1964), NFL player
 Clara Lanza (1858–1939), American author
 Cosimo Damiano Lanza (born 1962),  Italian pianist, harpsichordist and composer
 Damián Lanza (born 1982), Ecuadorian footballer
 Francesco "Frank" Lanza (died 1937), first crime boss of the Lanza crime family
 Giovanni Lanza (1810–1882), Italian politician
 Giuseppe Lanza, 17th century Sicilian nobleman
 Jack Lanza (aka Blackjack Lanza) (1935-2021), wrestler
 James Lanza (1902–2006), Italian-American mobster better known as 'Jimmy the Hat'
 Jessy Lanza (born 1985), Canadian musician
 Joseph Lanza (1904–1968), New York labor racketeer and member of the Genovese crime family 
 Laura Lanza (1529–1563), noblewoman in Sicily and murder victim
 Mario Lanza (1921–1959), American actor and opera singer
 Nimal Lanza, Sri Lankan Member of Parliament
 Pietro Lanza di Scalea (1863–1938), Italian noble and politician
 Robert Lanza (born 1956), American scientist

Given name
 Lanza del Vasto (1901–1981), Italian philosopher and activist.

Geography
Lanza (Milan Metro), station of Milan Metro
Lanzarote, one of the Canary Islands

See also
Lancia (disambiguation)
Lanze, German municipality in Schleswig-Holstein
Lanzo (disambiguation)

Italian-language surnames